FK Glogonj  is a Serbian football club based in the village of Glogonj near Pančevo, Serbia.

History
The club was founded in 1935. 

Glogonj won the 2004–05 Serbian League Vojvodina, but later was merged with PSK Pančevo.

Current squad

References

External links
 FK Glogonj at Srbijasport.net

Football clubs in Serbia
Football clubs in Vojvodina
Association football clubs established in 1935
1935 establishments in Serbia